Renews–Cappahayden is a small fishing town on the southern shore of Newfoundland,  south of St. John's.

The town was incorporated in the mid-1960s by amalgamating the formerly independent villages of Renews and Cappahayden.

Renews–Cappahayden had a population of 280 in the Canada 2021 Census.

Renews
The village was first settled by migratory fishermen and then by colonists. The colony was first proposed in 1610 by the London and Bristol Company, which had previously started an English colony at Cuper's Cove, but settlement was delayed by the presence of the pirate Peter Easton. In 1615, the territory was sold to William Vaughan who initially sent settlers to Aquaforte. Around 1617, Governor Richard Whitbourne moved six remaining colonists to Renews, but they had left by 1619. Vaughan soon sold land that crossed the Avalon Peninsula, including Renews harbour to Henry Cary, 1st Viscount Falkland who named the territory South Falkland.

According to a popular local legend (unsubstantiated ), the Mayflower landed at Renews in 1620, where it picked up water and supplies before sailing on to Plymouth Rock.

A battery was established there in 1755 and was manned consistently from thence until 1815, during the Napoleonic Wars.

Loyola Hearn, Canada's former Minister of Fisheries and Oceans, is from Renews.

Cappahayden

Cappahayden, once called Broad Cove, can date inhabitants located there in the late 18th century. Its location was reported by William Vaughan as early as 1626 when it was noted on a map as Vaughan's Cove. The name Cappahayden was given by Father John Walsh after his birthplace, Cappahayden, Kilkenny. The name Cappahayden was approved by the Newfoundland Nomenclature Board in 1913.

Cappahayden is the southern terminus of the East Coast Trail.

Just south of Cappahayden is the site of the tragic sinking of the SS Florizel at Horn Head Point, near Chance Cove Park. A monument to the sinking is located in Cappahayden, facing towards the wreck location.

Climate

Demographics 

See also
 List of cities and towns in Newfoundland and Labrador

References

Populated coastal places in Canada
Towns in Newfoundland and Labrador
Former English colonies
1617 establishments in the British Empire